VI is the sixth studio album by English gothic rock band The Danse Society.  One of the founder members of the post-punk and gothic rock movement in the 1980s released this studio album in September 2015, through the band's own record label, Society. The album was released in  a limited edition red vinyl and CD, including lyrics and artwork to each song. The album was re-issued in September 2016 as a deluxe version with the addition of the bonus tracks 'Sound of Silence' and 'If I were Jesus'

Track listing

Critical reception
'Punk-Online' said; "The Danse Society have matured from the goth style band of the eighties into a powerful five piece mixing music genre’s that takes your breath away. It’s more melodic than previous albums but still has that punk edge." Intavenous Magazine said of the album; "The album is reminiscent of Siouxsie and the Banshee's 'Hyena' with its sinister and dark intent, giving way to downright beautiful refrains. " "Whilst 'VI' sits well within their previous catalogue, it isn't afraid to stretch and move beyond the strict interpretations of the genre, probably a function of the fresh injection of blood that occurred prior to the recording".

Personnel
 Iain Hunter – drums
 Paul Nash – guitar,
 Maethelyiah – vocals
 Sam Bollands – keyboards
 Jack Cooper - Bass

References

External links
 The Danse Society official website
 The Danse Society at Discogs

The Danse Society albums